David Manning (born 1949) is a former British diplomat.

David Manning may also refer to:

 David Manning (fictitious writer), fictitious film critic
 David Manning (baseball) (born 1972), American baseball pitcher
 David Manning (cricketer) (born 1963), former English cricketer
 David Franklin Manning (1857–1929), justice of the New York Supreme Court
 Dave Manning (rugby league) (1910−1979), Australian rugby league player
 David Manning (police officer), police commissioner in Papua New Guinea
 D. J. Manning (David John Manning), British academic
 David Manning, pseudonym of Frederick Schiller Faust (1892–1944), American western author known as Max Brand
 David Manning, professional wrestling referee and booker best known for his work in the Texas-based World Class Championship Wrestling during the 1980s